The 2011–12 UIC Flames men's basketball team represents the University of Illinois at Chicago in the 2011–12 NCAA Division I men's basketball season. Their head coach is Howard Moore, serving his second year. The Flames play their home games at the UIC Pavilion and are members of the Horizon League.

Roster

Schedule

|-
!colspan=9 style=|Exhibition

|-
!colspan=9 style=| Regular season

|-
!colspan=9 style=| Horizon League tournament

References

UIC Flames
UIC Flames men's basketball seasons
UIC Flames men's basketball
UIC Flames men's basketball